In enzymology, a glutaminyl-peptide cyclotransferase is an enzyme that catalyzes the chemical reaction

L-glutaminyl-peptide  5-oxoprolyl-peptide + NH3 or
L-glutamyl-peptide  5-oxoprolyl-peptide + H2O

Hence, this enzyme has one substrate, L-glutaminyl-peptide or L-glutamyl-peptide, and two products, 5-oxoprolyl-peptide and NH3 or H2O. The N-terminal 5-oxoproline residue on the peptide is also commonly known as pyroglutamic acid.

This enzyme belongs to the family of transferases, specifically the aminoacyltransferases.  The systematic name of this enzyme class is L-glutaminyl-peptide gamma-glutamyltransferase (cyclizing). Other names in common use include glutaminyl-tRNA cyclotransferase, glutaminyl cyclase, and glutaminyl-transfer ribonucleate cyclotransferase.

Structural studies

Human gene
QPCT - note that Q is one-letter abbreviation for glutamine, and glutaminyl is the name of the acyl group.

References

 
 
 

EC 2.3.2
Enzymes of known structure